The 2015 Swindon Borough Council election took place on 7 May 2015, to elect members of Swindon Borough Council in England. This was on the same day as other local elections. The Conservative Party  increased their majority after gaining two seats.
Of the 19 seats up for election, four seats changed hands to leave the Conservatives (32) with a majority of seven seats over Labour (23) and the Lib Dems (2).

Ward results
Sitting councillors seeking re-election, elected in 2012, are marked with an asterisk (*). The ward results listed below are based on the changes from the 2014 elections, not taking into account any party defections or by-elections.

Blunsdon & Highworth

Central

Chiseldon & Lawn

Covingham & Dorcan

Eastcott

Gorse Hill & Pinehurst

Haydon Wick

Liden, Eldene & Park South

Lydiard and Freshbrook

Mannington and Western

Old Town

Penhill & Upper Stratton

Priory Vale

Rodbourne Cheney

Shaw

St Andrews

St Margaret & South Marston

Walcot & Park North

Wroughton & Wichelstowe

References

2015 English local elections
May 2015 events in the United Kingdom
2015
2010s in Wiltshire